Conference of the Birds is an album by American heavy metal band Om. It was released on April 17, 2006, on CD and on May 15, 2006, on vinyl, both through Holy Mountain. The album was pressed on black (2000 pressings), clear orange (500), and clear green vinyl (500). It was released on CD in Japan by Leaf Hound Records and includes a bonus track, "Bedouin's Vigil," which was originally released on the split 7-inch with Six Organs of Admittance.

Track listing 
Written and arranged by Om. Copyright Om Music (ASCAP).

Personnel 
Al Cisneros – bass, vocals
Chris Hakius – drums, percussion

Production
Produced by Om and Billy Anderson
Recorded, engineered and mixed by Billy Anderson and Kevin Lemon

See also 
 The Conference of the Birds

References

External links 
MP3.com album main page
"Conference of the Birds" at discogs

2006 albums
Om (band) albums
Albums produced by Billy Anderson (producer)